The Intermuseum Conservation Association ( doing business as ICA-Art Conservation or ICA) is the oldest non-profit art conservation center in the United States, currently located in Cleveland, OH.  The ICA offers conservation and preservation treatments for paintings, murals, works on paper, documents, objects of all media, outdoor sculpture, monuments, and textiles.

History

The Intermuseum Conservation Association (ICA) was founded in 1952 on the campus of Oberlin College in Oberlin, OH. Six directors of major Midwestern museums wanted to create a professional art conservation laboratory. Richard Buck from the Harvard Art Department was the first director of the ICA and served for 20 years.  In 2003, the ICA left Oberlin and moved to its current location on the Detroit Shoreway in Cleveland. The new building was once the headquarters of the Vitrolite Company, manufacturers of a popular opaque glass used in 1920s-1950s interior and exterior design. The Vitrolite Building is on the National Register of Historical Places. The ICA is currently restoring the last surviving Vitrolite glass-decorated showroom in the country, for use as an educational and  public meeting space.

Services
The ICA has an open 8000 square foot laboratory space for all four conservation specialties: objects, textiles, works on paper, and painting conservation. Beyond conserving and restoring pieces of art, the ICA offers educational programs for learners of all ages, disaster response services, fine art storage, insurance claim assistance, custom mounting and framing, and installation services.

Selected List of Member Institutions
Akron Art Museum
Allen Memorial Art Museum
Cleveland Clinic Foundation
Cleveland Museum of Art
Cleveland Public Library
Kent State University Museum
Maltz Museum of Jewish Heritage
Progressive Art Collection
Rock and Roll Hall of Fame and Museum
Stan Hywet Hall and Gardens

Selected examples of ICA projects
Saul Steinberg’s mural of Cincinnati 
Carnegie Museum of Art’s Hall of Architecture
Indiana State Museum’s 92 County Walk 
RagGonNon "Journeys" Quilt by Aminah Brenda Lyn Robinson at the National Underground Railroad Freedom Center
Model Ship from Allen County Museum
Joan Miró Mural from Cincinnati Art Museum
Playhouse Square’s State Theater mural by James Daugherty
William Sommer's and Ora Coltman's murals in the Cleveland Public Library
Restoring and conserving multiple murals from the Federal Art Project in the region.
Stored a large portion of the Akron Art Museum’s collection during its renovation, doing conservation work on the sculpture "The Inverted Q"

References

External links
Intermuseum Conservation Association
Ohio Preservation Council
Regional Alliance for Preservation
Alliance for Response

Organizations based in Cleveland
Conservation and restoration organizations